Why Girls Leave Home is a lost 1921 American silent drama film produced by Harry Rapf for Warner Bros. It was the only film from the studio to make a profit in 1921. The poster for the film was featured in the 1962 film Gypsy.

Why Girls Go Back Home (1926) is a sequel to the film that was also produced by Warner Bros.

Plot
Mr. Hedder (George Lessey) is an old fashioned man who will not let his daughter Anna (Anna Q. Nilsson) own an evening gown, but she is given one by a friend who is a model. Hedder believes that she stole it and confers with Mr. Wallace (Claude King), the owner of the store. On Wallace's advice, Hedder hits Anna, causing her to leave home and move in with some gold diggers. She discovers that Wallace is a lenient father, and his daughter, Madeline (Maurine Powers) frequents less-than-reputable nightclubs, and is also the pawn of Mr. Reynolds (Coit Albertson), who is dating her for business reasons. Anna discovers Madeline alone in Anna's apartment and uses this to get back at Wallace. She eventually sends Madeline home, and the two fathers reconcile with their daughters.

Cast
Anna Q. Nilsson as Anna Hedder
Maurine Powers as Madeline Wallace
Julia Swayne Gordon as Mrs. Wallace
Corinne Barker as Ethel, a gold digger
Katherine Perry as Edith, a gold digger
Kate Blancke as Mrs. Hedder
Claude King as Mr. Wallace
Coit Albertson as Mr. Reynolds
George Lessey as Mr. Hedder
John B. O'Brien as Joseph
Dan Mason as Dodo
Arthur Gordini as Mr. Jackson

Box office
According to Warner Bros records the film earned $410,000 domestically and $40,000 in foreign.

Preservation status
This film is now lost. Warner Bros. records of the film's negative have a notation, "Junked 12/27/48" (i.e., December 27, 1948). Warner Bros. destroyed many of its negatives in the late 1940s and 1950s due to nitrate film pre-1933 decomposition. No copies of Why Girls Leave Home are known to exist.

References

External links

1921 films
American silent feature films
Films directed by William Nigh
Lost American films
1921 drama films
Silent American drama films
Films produced by Harry Rapf
American black-and-white films
Warner Bros. films
1920s American films
1920s English-language films